Maksatmyrat Şamyradow (born 6 May 1984) is a former Turkmen footballer. Currently goalkeeper coach with Altyn Asyr.

Career
Şamyradow featured for FC Aşgabat in the 2008, and 2009 editions of the CIS cup

In 2010–2012, played for the Iranian Gol Gohar.

Since 2013, the player of Uzbek Olmaliq FK.

References

External links
 

1984 births
Living people
Turkmenistan footballers
Turkmenistan international footballers
Expatriate footballers in Iran
Gol Gohar players
FC Aşgabat players
Naft Tehran F.C. players
Association football goalkeepers